Persea is a genus of about 150 species of evergreen trees belonging to the laurel family, Lauraceae. The best-known member of the genus is the avocado, P. americana, widely cultivated in subtropical regions for its large, edible fruit.

Overview

Distribution and ecology

The species of Persea have a disjunct distribution, with about 70 Neotropical species, ranging from Brazil and Chile in South America to Central America and Mexico, the Caribbean, and the southeastern United States; a single species, P. indica, endemic to Madeira and the Canary Islands off northwest Africa; and 80 species inhabiting east and southeast Asia. A number of these species are found in forests that face threats of destruction or deforestation; for example, P. meyeniana in Central Chile.

The family Lauraceae was part of the land flora of Gondwana, and many genera had migrated to South America via Antarctica over ocean landbridges by the time of the Paleocene. From South America they spread over most of the continent. When the North American and South American tectonic plates joined in the late Neogene, volcanic mountain building created island chains which later formed the Mesoamerican landbridge. Pliocene elevation created new habitats for speciation. While some genera died out in increasingly xerophytic mainland Africa, starting with the freezing of Antarctica about 20 million years ago and the formation of the Benguela current, others, which also reached South America and Mesoamerica, such as Beilschmiedia and Nectandra are still surviving today in Africa in a number of species. The genus, however, died out in Africa, except for P. indica, which is, today, a threatened species that survives in the fog-shrouded mountains of the Canary Islands and Madeira.

Fossil evidence indicates that the genus originated in West Africa during the Paleocene, and spread to Asia, to South America, and to Europe and thence to North America. It is thought that the gradual drying of Africa, west Asia, and the Mediterranean from the Oligocene to the Pleistocene, and the glaciation of Europe during the Pleistocene, caused the extinction of the genus across these regions, resulting in the present distribution.

Since this habitat is constantly threatened by encroaching agriculture, the laurel forest animal or vegetal species have already become rare in many of its former habitats and are threatened by further habitat loss.

In Mesoamerica, Persea proliferated into many new species, and the berries of some of them constitute a valuable food supply for quetzals, trogoniform birds that live in the montane rainforests of Mesoamerica. In particular, the resplendent quetzal's favorite fruits are berries of wild relatives of the avocado. Their differing maturing times in the cloudforest determine the migratory movements of the quetzals to differing elevation levels in the forests. Wheelright in 1983 observed that parent quetzals take far less time intervals to deliver fruits to the young brood than insects or lizards, reflecting the ease of procuring fruits, as opposed to capturing animal prey. Since the young are fed exclusively berries in the first 2 weeks after hatching, these berries must be of high nutritional value. Usually only the total percentage of water, sugar, nitrogen, crude fats and carbohydrates are reported by ornithologists.

Persea species are also used as food plants by the larvae of some Lepidoptera species including giant leopard moth, Coleophora octagonella (which feeds exclusively on P. carolinensis) and Hypercompe indecisa.

Classification
The genus Persea is treated in three subgenera. The Asian subgenus Machilus is treated in a separate genus Machilus by many authors, including in the Flora of China, while graft-incompatibility between subgenus Persea and subgenus Eriodaphne suggests that these too may be better treated as distinct genera, in fact Kostermans (1993) founded the genus Mutisiopersea for these. Another closely related genus, Beilschmiedia, is also sometimes included in Persea.

In a phylogenetic analysis of the "Persea group", which also includes Alseodaphne, Phoebe, Nothaphoebe, Dehaasia and Apollonias, Persea was found to be mostly monophyletic, with Apollonias barbujana from the Canary Islands nested within the core Persea group. The species Persea nudigemma was found to be more closely related to Phoebe, while Persea sphaerocarpa was found to be nested within a group of Alseodaphne species.

Subgenus Persea — Central America. Two species.
Persea americana Mill. – Avocado
Persea americana var. drymifolia (Schltdl. & Cham.) S.F.Blake
Persea americana var. floccosa (Mez) Scora
Persea americana var. guatemalensis (L.O.Williams) Scora
Persea americana var. nubigena (L.O.Williams) L.E.Kopp
Persea americana var. steyermarkii (C.K.Allen) Scora
Persea schiedeana Nees – Coyo

Subgenus Eriodaphne (Mutisiopersea) — The Americas, Macaronesia. About 70 species, including
Persea alpigena
Persea borbonia (L.) Spreng. – Redbay
Persea brevipetiolata van der Werff from Mexico
Persea caerulea (Ruiz & Pav.) Mez
Persea cinerascens
Persea donnell-smithii Mez
Persea indica (L.) Spreng. – Viñátigo (possibly better treated in a fourth subgenus of its own)
Persea lingue (Ruiz & Pav.) Nees – Lingue
Persea longipes (Schltdl.) Meisn.
Persea meyeniana Nees
Persea palustris (Raf.) Sarg. – Swampbay
Persea skutchii

Subgenus Machilus — Asia. About 80 species, including
Persea edulis
Persea ichangensis
Persea japonica (Siebold & Zucc.) Kosterm.
Persea kadooriei From Hong Kong.
Persea kobu
Persea macrantha
Persea nanmu Oliv.
Persea thunbergii (Siebold & Zucc.) Kosterm.
Persea yunnanensis

Formerly placed here
Cinnamodendron cinnamomifolium (Kunth) Kosterm. (as P. cinnamomifolia Kunth or P. mexicana (Meisn.) Hemsl.)
Laurus azorica (Seub.) Franco (as P. azorica Seub.)

Phylogeny 
Based on

Etymology
Philip Miller derived Persea from the Greek name .  It was applied by Theophrastus and Hippocrates to an uncertain Egyptian tree, possibly Cordia myxa or a Mimusops species.

References

Bibliography
André Joseph Guillaume Henri Kostermans. 1993. Mutisiopersea Kostermans, a new genus in Lauraceae. Rheedea 3: 132–135.
C. Michael Hogan. 2008. Chilean Wine Palm: Jubaea chilensis, GlobalTwitcher.com, ed. Nicklas Stromberg
Lucille E. Kopp. 1966. "A taxonomic revision of the genus Persea in the Western Hemisphere (Persea-Lauracese)" Memoirs of the New York Botanical Garden 14(1): pp. 1–117

External links

Avocado source Extensive information on the Avocado and the genus generally, particularly the subgenera Persea and Eriodaphne
Flora of North America: Persea
Flora of China: Machilus Full list of species in Machilus in China

 
Lauraceae genera
Taxa named by Philip Miller